Andrei Aleksandrovich Vasyanovich (born 13 June 1988) is a Russian professional footballer.

Club career
He made his professional debut in the Russian Second Division in 2005 for FC Krasnodar-2000.

External links

References

1988 births
Sportspeople from Krasnodar
Living people
Russian footballers
Russia under-21 international footballers
Association football defenders
FC Moscow players
Russian Premier League players
PFC Spartak Nalchik players
FC Zhemchuzhina Sochi players
FC Rotor Volgograd players
FC Baltika Kaliningrad players
FC Sokol Saratov players
PFC CSKA Moscow players
FC Torpedo Moscow players
FC Neftekhimik Nizhnekamsk players
FC Dynamo Bryansk players